This is a list of seasons played by Hapoel Herzliya Football Club in Israeli and European football, from 1934–35 (when the club first competed in the Cup) to the most recent completed season. It details the club's achievements in major competitions, and the top scorers for each season. Top scorers in bold were also the top scorers in the Israeli league that season. Records of minor competitions such as the Lilian Cup are not included due to them being considered of less importance than the State Cup and the Toto Cup.

The club had played in the Palestine League from 1938 to 1947. After the establishment of Israel, the club mostly played in lower divisions.

History
Hapoel Herzliya Sports Club was established in 1928, playing its first recorded football matches in November 1931. The club won the second division in 1937 and was promoted to the top division, where the club played until relegating at the end of the 1946–47 season, after which the club slipped down the divisions, reaching bottom division Liga Gimel in 1956. The club played in second division Liga Alef between 1963 and 1976, but once again relegated, reaching its lowest ever placing, playing in fifth division Liga Bet in 1999–2000. The club managed to return to the second division in 2010.

Seasons

Key

 P = Played
 W = Games won
 D = Games drawn
 L = Games lost
 F = Goals for
 A = Goals against
 Pts = Points
 Pos = Final position

 Leumit = Liga Leumit (National League)
 Artzit = Liga Artzit (Nationwide League)
 Premier = Liga Al (Premier League)
 Pal. League = Palestine League

 F = Final
 Group = Group stage
 QF = Quarter-finals
 QR1 = First Qualifying Round
 QR2 = Second Qualifying Round
 QR3 = Third Qualifying Round
 QR4 = Fourth Qualifying Round
 RInt = Intermediate Round

 R1 = Round 1
 R2 = Round 2
 R3 = Round 3
 R4 = Round 4
 R5 = Round 5
 R6 = Round 6
 SF = Semi-finals

Notes

References

Hapoel Herzliya F.C.
 
Hapoel Herzliya